Strictly Hip Hop: The Best of Cypress Hill, is a 2010 compilation album by hip hop group Cypress Hill. Released in a slipcased jewel case by Sony Music on their budget Camden Deluxe imprint, it contains single and album tracks, b-sides and remixes. The four-page booklet contains an essay by Agent J from the internet radio show Groovement Radio. The booklet, slip case and CD sleeve contain track listing errors (see 'Notes').

The album is named after the track that originally appeared on the album Cypress Hill III: Temples of Boom.

Track listing 
Strictly Hip Hop: The Best of Cypress Hill

Notes
 "How I Could Just Kill a Man" is mistitled as How Could I Just Kill a Man.
 "Checkmate" is the Hang 'Em High Remix Radio Edit from the Stash EP and not the titled (and unedited) mix from the "(Rock) Superstar" CD single.
 "Can't Get the Best of Me" is the 'clean' Radio Edit.
 "Roll it up Again" was a bonus track on the Japanese version of the album Till Death Do Us Part  and was also the b-side to the single "What's Your Number" (where it was titled simply "Roll it Up").
 The instrumental segues present after the album versions of some tracks (e.g. "Lowrider" and "Stank Ass Hoe") are maintained throughout and have not been removed.
(*) This is the first time these remixes have been released on album.

References

External links
[ Strictly Hip Hop at Allmusic]

Cypress Hill albums
Albums produced by DJ Muggs
2010 greatest hits albums